Raduń  is a settlement in the administrative district of Gmina Gryfice, within Gryfice County, West Pomeranian Voivodeship, in north-western Poland.

Before 1637 the area was part of Duchy of Pomerania. For the history of the region, see History of Pomerania.

The settlement has a population of 116.

References

Villages in Gryfice County